Christopher Vane may refer to:

Christopher Vane, 1st Baron Barnard (1653–1723), English peer
Christopher Vane, 10th Baron Barnard (1888–1964), British peer and military officer
Christopher Vane (screenwriter), American television producer and writer